Littleby Creek is a stream in Audrain County in the U.S. state of Missouri. It is a tributary of the South Fork Salt River.

Littleby Creek has the name of Robert Littleby, an early settler.

See also
List of rivers of Missouri

References

Rivers of Audrain County, Missouri
Rivers of Missouri